Waylla may refer to:

 Waylla (Bolivia-Chile)
 Waylla Tira